Marietta was an American emo band from Philadelphia, Pennsylvania.

History
Marietta began in late 2011. They released a split with Modern Baseball in 2012 titled Couples Therapy.

In 2013, Marietta released their first full-length album titled Summer Death.

In April 2015, Marietta released an EP titled Cuts. On August 17, 2015, Marietta released their second full-length album titled As It Were.

In December 2015, Marietta announced on their Facebook page that they were breaking up.

On May 1, 2020, Marietta released an EP called 'Summer Demos 2012' containing demos of songs produced when the band first formed.

Band members
Ben Johnson – bass
Evan Lescallette – guitar, lead vocals
Andrew Weigel – drums
Ethan Willard – guitar, lead vocals

Discography
Studio albums
Summer Death (2013, Dog Knights Productions)
As It Were (2015, Good Sadie Media, Sorry Girls Records, Near Mint Records)
EPs
Couples Therapy (2012, Grandpa's Miscellaneous Media Collection)
″Cuts″ 7″ EP by Marietta 2015 Dogknights
summer demos 2012 (2020, Near Mint)

References

Musical groups from Philadelphia
American emo musical groups
Musical groups established in 2011
2011 establishments in Pennsylvania
Emo revival groups